Kings Point is a village located on the Great Neck Peninsula in the Town of North Hempstead in Nassau County, on the North Shore of Long Island, in New York, United States. The population was 5,005 at the 2010 census.

History 
The Village of Kings Point incorporated in November 1924. It is named for the King family, which owned large portions of land in the area.

The entire area was formerly known as Hewlett's Point for the Hewlett family, which owned land in the area, as well; this name is still used at times in reference to the northern tip of the village.

Geography

According to the United States Census Bureau, the village has a total area of 4.0 square miles (10.3 km2), of which 3.3 square miles (8.7 km2) is land and 0.6 square miles (1.7 km2) (16.08%) is water.

Kings Point is surrounded on three sides by water. It touches Little Neck Bay to the west, the Long Island Sound to the north, and Manhasset Bay to the east.

Demographics

As of the census of 2000, there were 5,076 people, 1,401 households, and 1,203 families residing in the village. The population density was 1,519.0 people per square mile (586.8/km2). There were 1,455 housing units at an average density of 435.4 per square mile (168.2/km2). The racial makeup of the village was 91.67% White, 0.87% African American, 0.08% Native American, 3.55% Asian, 0.65% from other races, and 3.19% from two or more races. Hispanic or Latino of any race were 1.95% of the population.

As of 2000 Kings Point was the most Iranian conurbation in the United States with 29.7% of its population reporting Iranian Jewish ancestry.

There were 1,401 households, out of which 38.0% had children under the age of 18 living with them, 79.7% were married couples living together, 4.0% had a female householder with no husband present, and 14.1% were non-families. 11.9% of all households were made up of individuals, and 7.4% had someone living alone who was 65 years of age or older. The average household size was 3.14 and the average family size was 3.38.

In the village, the population was spread out, with 24.1% under the age of 18, 17.8% from 18 to 24, 17.4% from 25 to 44, 26.1% from 45 to 64, and 14.6% who were 65 years of age or older. The median age was 37 years. For every 100 females, there were 122.2 males. For every 100 females age 18 and over, there were 125.7 males.

The median income for a household in the village was $116,957, and the median income for a family was $122,692. Males had a median income of $100,714 versus $50,595 for females. The per capita income for the village was $57,965. About 0.8% of families and 2.0% of the population were below the poverty line, including 2.3% of those under age 18 and 2.6% of those age 65 or over.

Government

Village government 
As of March 2023, the Mayor of Kings Point is Kouros "Kris" Torkan, the Deputy Mayor is Hooshang Nematzadeh, and the Village Trustees are Ira S. Nesenoff, Tedi Kashinejad and Shahriar (Ebi) Victory.

Village police 

The Village of Kings Point operates its own police department. The Kings Point Police Department, as such, is responsible for providing police protection services within the village.

As of March 2023, the Commissioner of the Kings Point Police Department is Daniel Flanagan.

Representation in higher government

Town representation 
Kings Point is located in the Town of North Hempstead's 4th district, which as of March 2023 is represented on the Town Board by Veronica Lurvey (D–Great Neck).

Nassau County representation 
Kings Point is located in Nassau County's 10th Legislative district, which as of March 2023 is represented in the Nassau County Legislature by Mazi Melesa Pilip (R–Great Neck).

New York State representation

New York State Assembly 
Kings Point is located in the New York State Assembly's 16th Assembly district, which as of March 2023 is represented by Gina Sillitti (D–Manorhaven).

New York State Senate 
Kings Point is located in the New York State Senate's 7th State Senate district, which as of March 2023 is represented in the New York State Senate by Jack M. Martins (R–Mineola).

Federal representation

United States Congress 
Kings Point is located in New York's 3rd congressional district, which as of March 2023 is represented in the United States Congress by George Santos (R).

United States Senate 
Like the rest of New York, Kings Point is represented in the United States Senate by Charles Schumer (D) and Kirsten Gillibrand (D).

Politics 
In the 2016 U.S. presidential election, the majority of Kings Point voters voted for Donald Trump (R).

Parks and recreation 
Kings Point is located entirely within the boundaries of (and is thus served by) the Great Neck Park District. The special district operates two parks which are located entirely within Kings Point: Kings Point Park and Steppingstone Park and Marina. Additionally, the park district's Parkwood Pool and Sports Complex is partially located within the village, on its border with the Incorporated Village of Great Neck.

Other recreational facilities within the village include the Broadlawn Harbour Yacht Club, the Kennilworth Pool Club, and the Shelter Bay Yacht Club – all of which are privately-owned.

Education

School district 
Kings Point is located entirely within the boundaries of (and is thus served by) the Great Neck Union Free School District. As such, all children who reside within the village and attend public schools go to Great Neck's schools.

Additionally, John F. Kennedy Elementary School is located within the village, and Great Neck North Middle School is located on Kings Point's border with the Incorporated Village of Great Neck.

Library district 
Kings Point is located wholly within the boundaries of (and is thus served by) the Great Neck Library District.

Higher education 
The United States Merchant Marine Academy is located within the village, along Little Neck Bay.

Infrastructure

Transportation

Road 
Major roadways in Kings Point include Bayview Avenue, East Shore Road, Kings Point Road, Middle Neck Road, Redbrook Road, and Steamboat Road.

Rail 
No rail lines run through Kings Point. The nearest Long Island Rail Road station to the village is Great Neck on the Port Washington Branch.

Bus 

Kings Point is served by the n57 and n58 bus routes, which are operated by Nassau Inter-County Express.

Utilities

Natural gas 
National Grid USA provides natural gas to homes and businesses that are hooked up to natural gas lines in Kings Point.

Power 
PSEG Long Island provides power to all homes and businesses within Kings Point.

Sewage 
Kings Point is primarily unsewered. As such, the entirety of the village relies on cesspools and septic systems. The only major exception is the United States Merchant Marine Academy, which operates its own sanitary sewer network.

Water 
Kings Point is located within the boundaries of the Water Authority of Great Neck North, which provides the entirety of the village with water.

Landmarks 
Kings Point is the home of the United States Merchant Marine Academy and its maritime museum, the American Merchant Marine Museum.

There is also a lighthouse known as the Kings Point Light. This is a private building which is owned and operated by the United States Merchant Marine Academy. It is the lighthouse on top of the chapel that shines as a way to bring wayfaring sailors back home from at sea and students back from Long Island Sound, also known as the "Play Pen."

Notable people
 Sol Atlas (1907–1973), real estate developer 
 Sid Caesar (1922–2014), comic actor and writer, lived in Kings Point from the 1950s to the late 1970s in a home on the water 
 Barrie Chase (born 1933), actress and dancer, born in Kings Point
 Walter Chrysler (1875–1940), automobile pioneer, died in Kings Point
 George M. Cohan (1878–1942), entertainer, playwright, composer, actor, lyricist, singer, dancer and producer, lived in Kings Point 1914-1920 
 Arthur G. Cohen (1930-2014), American businessman and real estate developer.
 F. Scott Fitzgerald (1896-1940), as noted below.
 Vitas Gerulaitis (1954–1994), professional tennis player, former Kings Point resident
 W.R. Grace, as noted above.
 Emily Hughes (born 1989), member of the U.S. figure skating team at the 2006 Winter Olympics
 Sarah Hughes (born 1985), gold medalist in figure skating at the 2002 Winter Olympics
 Andy Kaufman (1949–1984), comedian and actor
 Alan King (1927–2004), comedian and actor
 Morris S. Levy, film and television producer
 Fred Ohebshalom (born 1952), New York City real estate developer
 Bobby Rosengarden (1924-2007), jazz drummer and bandleader, former Kings Point resident
 Tamir Sapir (1946/1947–2014), businessman and investor
 Fred Schwartz (1932-2016), furrier, philanthropist and television pitchman
 Stanley Silverstein (1924–2016), entrepreneur who was co-founder of Nina Footwear

Official newspaper 
The Great Neck Record is the newspaper of record for the Village of Kings Point.

The Great Gatsby
In the 1920s, F. Scott Fitzgerald lived in Great Neck, at 6 Gateway Drive in Great Neck Estates, which is probably Great Neck's greatest claim to fame. It was a modest house, not dissimilar to that of Nick, the protagonist of his novel, The Great Gatsby. It is said that Fitzgerald modeled West Egg, the fictional town in which Nick lived, next to the mansion of Jay Gatsby, after Great Neck (specifically Kings Point), for its epitome of nouveau riche gaudiness, atmosphere, and lifestyle. He modeled East Egg, the town where Daisy and Tom lived, after Great Neck's eastern neighbor Sands Point, which is part of Port Washington.

References

External links 

Official website

Great Neck Peninsula
Iranian-American culture in New York (state)
Iranian-Jewish culture in the United States
Town of North Hempstead, New York
Villages in New York (state)
Villages in Nassau County, New York
Populated coastal places in New York (state)